José Méndez (9 May 1937 – 8 January 2021) was a Spanish rower. He competed in the men's coxed four event at the 1960 Summer Olympics.

References

External links
 

1937 births
2021 deaths
Spanish male rowers
Olympic rowers of Spain
Rowers at the 1960 Summer Olympics
Sportspeople from Pontevedra